Frank Ullrich (born 24 January 1958) is a German politician of the SPD and former biathlete and trainer of the German national team. Since 2021, he has been a member of the Bundestag.

Career

Biathlon was in Ullrich's family as his father was a biathlon referee. His first appearance was in 1967 at the GDR Children Championships. In 1972, he placed second over 5 km at the Spartakiad, in 1975 he became Youth World Champion in relay. He won a bronze medal at the 1976 Winter Olympics with the 4 × 7.5 km relay team. At the 1980 Winter Olympics he won 3 medals with silvers in the 20 km individual and the 4 × 7.5 km relay and a gold medal in the 10 km sprint, an event he dominated at world level between 1978 and 1981.

In 1982 his wife fell ill and died, soon after which he switched to training. He undertook a period of study at the National Academy for Body Culture and then, in 1987, became the trainer of the East Germany national team, and, following German reunification, national trainer for the sprint.

Speaking to Ullrich's dominance in the World Cup, even though he retired in the mid-80s, only five male biathletes have surpassed him in terms of World Cup victories. Sven Fischer won his 17th World Cup victory on 18 March 2000, Ole Einar Bjørndalen won his on 12 January 2001, Raphaël Poirée won on 18 January 2002, whilst Emil Hegle Svendsen won on 2 December 2010 and Martin Fourcade won on 12 January 2013.

Politics 
Ullrich, who has a working class background and whose grandfather was a "passionate social democrat", was a direct candidate for the SPD in the 2021 German federal election. He won his electoral constituency (Suhl – Schmalkalden-Meiningen – Hildburghausen – Sonneberg in Thuringia) with 33.5 %, making him a member of the 20th Bundestag. The local election was observed closely by the German public because Ullrich ran against Hans-Georg Maaßen, the controversial former head of the German domestic intelligence service.

Biathlon results
All results are sourced from the International Biathlon Union.

Olympic Games
4 medals (1 gold, 2 silver, 1 bronze)

*Sprint was added as an event in 1980.

World Championships
14 medals (9 gold, 4 silver, 1 bronze)

*During Olympic seasons competitions are only held for those events not included in the Olympic program.

Individual victories
17 victories (6 In, 11 Sp)

*Results are from UIPMB and IBU races which include the Biathlon World Cup, Biathlon World Championships and the Winter Olympic Games.

References

External links
 
 
 

1958 births
Living people
People from Schmalkalden-Meiningen
Sportspeople from Thuringia
German male biathletes
Biathletes at the 1976 Winter Olympics
Biathletes at the 1980 Winter Olympics
Biathletes at the 1984 Winter Olympics
Olympic biathletes of East Germany
Medalists at the 1976 Winter Olympics
Medalists at the 1980 Winter Olympics
Olympic medalists in biathlon
Olympic bronze medalists for East Germany
Olympic silver medalists for East Germany
Olympic gold medalists for East Germany
Biathlon World Championships medalists
Recipients of the Patriotic Order of Merit in silver
Recipients of the Cross of the Order of Merit of the Federal Republic of Germany
Members of the Bundestag 2021–2025
Members of the Bundestag for Thuringia
Members of the Bundestag for the Social Democratic Party of Germany